Benjamin Beit-Hallahmi (born June 12, 1943) is an Israeli professor of psychology at the University of Haifa, Israel. In 1970 Beit-Hallahmi received a PhD in clinical psychology from Michigan State University.

Bibliography

Books 
 Psychoanalysis and religion: A bibliography, Norwood Editions, 1978
 Israeli Connection, 1982, 
 Prolegomena to the Psychological Study of Religion, 1989, 
 Despair and Deliverance: Private Salvation in Contemporary Israel, 1992, 
 The Annotated Dictionary of Modern Religious Movements, 1994, 
 Religion, Psychopathology And Coping.(International Series in the Psychology of Religion 4), 1996, Rodopi Bv Editions, 
 Psychoanalytic Studies of Religion : A Critical Assessment and Annotated Bibliography, 1996, 
 The Psychology of Religious Behaviour, Belief and Experience, 1997, w/ Michael Argyle, Routledge, 
 The Illustrated Encyclopedia of Active New Religions, Sects, and Cults, 1997, 
 Original Sins: Reflections on the History of Zionism and Israel, 1998, 
Misunderstanding cults: Searching for Objectivity in a Controversial Field, Contributor

Papers 
 "Dangers of the vagina". British Journal of Medical Psychology, volume 58, 351–356.
 Old Identities and New Religions in Israel, Syzygy: Journal of Alternative Religion and Culture, Volume 1: Issue 2–3,
 Scientology: Religion or racket?, 2003, Marburg Journal of Religion, Volume 8, No. 1
 Dear Colleagues: Integrity and Suspicion in NRM Research,  presented at the 1997 annual meeting of the Society for the Scientific Study of Religion

See also
List of cult and new religious movement researchers

References

External links
 Beit-Hallahmi, B.Scientology: Religion or racket?, Marburg Journal of Religion, 8, September 2003.
 Benjamin Beit-Hallahmi,Michael Argyle, The psychology of religious behaviour, belief and experience, Google Books
 Michael Argyle,Benjamin Beit-Hallahmi, The social psychology of religion, Google Books
 Benjamin Beit-Hallahmi, Psychoanalytic studies of religion: a critical assessment and annotated Bibliography, Google Books
 Benjamin Beit-Hallahmi, Despair and deliverance: private salvation in contemporary Israel, Google Books
 Benjamin Beit-Hallahmi, The Israeli connection: whom Israel arms and why, Google Books
 (Editors) Zvi Sobel, Benjamin Beit-Hallahmi, Tradition, innovation, conflict: Jewishness and Judaism in contemporary Israel, Google Books
 John Bunzl,Benjamin Beit-Hallahmi (Editors), Psychoanalysis, identity, and ideology: critical essays on the Israel, Google Books

1943 births
Living people
Israeli psychologists
Michigan State University alumni
Academic staff of the University of Haifa
New York University faculty
People from Tel Aviv
Researchers of new religious movements and cults